Dal is a term in the Indian subcontinent for dried, split pulses.

Dal or DAL may also refer to:

Places

Cambodia 
Dal, Ke Chong

Finland 
 Laakso, a neighbourhood of Helsinki

India 
Dal Lake, in Srinagar, Jammu and Kashmir, India
Dal Lake (Himachal Pradesh), India

Iran 
Dal, Khuzestan
Dal, Kurdistan

Norway 
Dal, Norway
Dal Station

Romania 
Dál, the Hungarian name of Deal, Câlnic, Alba

Sweden 
Dal Hundred, Östergötland
Dal River

Science and technology
 Data access layer, a software architecture layer
 Database abstraction layer, an application programming interface
 Decalitre, a measure of volume
 Direct Algebraic Logic, Sharp's calculator input method 
 Development Assurance Level in ARP4754

Transport 
 Dallas Love Field, an airport in Dallas, Texas
 Delta Air Lines, ICAO airline code DAL
 Deutsche Afrika-Linien, a German shipping company

Other uses
 Abbreviations for the sports teams of Dallas, Texas:
 Dallas Cowboys of the National Football League
 Dallas Mavericks of the National Basketball Association
 Dallas Stars of the National Hockey League
 Dal (name), including a list of people with the surname, given name or nickname
 Dāl, Arabic letter د
 Ḏāl, Arabic letter ذ
 Dal (Doctor Who), former name of the Daleks in Doctor Who
 Dal (dish) is an Indian food that is made from Dal or Lentils
 Dalhousie University, commonly known as Dal, Halifax, Nova Scotia, Canada
 Diplomatic Academy of London, an online institution
 Dal, a scheduled tribe in India
 Dal, a Pullip fashion doll
 Dal, a fictional character in The Tribe (1999 TV series)

See also

Dahl (disambiguation)
Daal (disambiguation)
 DALnet, an Internet Relay Chat network